Astrotischeria is a genus of moths in the family Tischeriidae. It was described by Puplesis and Diškus in 2003.

Species
 Astrotischeria alcedoensis B. Landry, 2004
 Astrotischeria ambrosiaeella  (Chambers, 1875)
 Astrotischeria astericola  (Braun, 1972)
 Astrotischeria explosa  (Braun, 1923)
 Astrotischeria gregaria  (Braun, 1972)
 Astrotischeria helianthi  (Frey & Boll, 1878)
 Astrotischeria heliopsisella  (Chambers, 1875)
 Astrotischeria heteroterae  (Frey & Boll, 1878)
 Astrotischeria longeciliata  (Frey & Boll, 1878)
 Astrotischeria marginata  (Braun, 1972)
 Astrotischeria occidentalis  (Braun, 1972)
 Astrotischeria omissa  (Braun, 1927)
 Astrotischeria pallidipennella  (Braun, 1972)
 Astrotischeria scalesiaella B. Landry, 2004
 Astrotischeria solidagonifoliella  (Clemens, 1859)

References

External links

Tischeriidae
Monotrysia genera